Bis(benzonitrile)palladium dichloride is the coordination complex with the formula PdCl2(NCC6H5)2.  It is the adduct of two benzonitrile (PhCN) ligands with palladium(II) chloride.  It is a yellow-brown solid that is soluble in organic solvents.  The compound is a reagent and a precatalyst for reactions that require soluble Pd(II).  A closely related compound is bis(acetonitrile)palladium dichloride.

The complex is prepared by dissolving PdCl2 in warm benzonitrile. The PhCN ligands are labile, and the complex reverts to PdCl2 in noncoordinating solvents.  According to X-ray crystallography, the two PhCN ligands are mutually trans.

References

Palladium compounds
Homogeneous catalysis
Coordination complexes
Chloro complexes
Benzonitriles